39 Canadian Brigade Group (39 CBG) is a Canadian Forces formation of the Canadian Army under the 3rd Canadian Division. The brigade group is composed of Canadian Forces (CF) Primary Reserve units, all of which are based within the province of British Columbia. 39 CBG Headquarters is located at the Major-General B.M. Hoffmeister OC, CB, CBE, DSO Building, 1755 West 1st Avenue, Vancouver.

The brigade group is made of approximately 1,500 soldiers located in reserve units located in communities across British Columbia. Most of the soldiers in 39 CBG are reservists, serving part-time within their communities.

The brigade maintains armoured, artillery, infantry, engineer and service support units to assist Joint Task Force Pacific (JTFP) and Canadian Joint Operations Command with domestic operations support (natural disasters, etc.), as well as supporting the Regular Force units of the 3rd Canadian Division by supporting and augmenting its battle groups. Soldiers of 39 CBG are trained in supporting domestic and also expeditionary operations. Every year many members of 39 CBG volunteer to serve all over the world in UN and NATO deployments. Hundreds of soldiers within the brigade have experience in deploying to the mission in Afghanistan as well as deploying to support the security operations for the Vancouver 2010 Olympic and Paralympic Winter Games.

Brigade units

Other units
39 CBG is supported by several other units that provide specialist duties, such as medical services, military police and intelligence. These units do not fall under the 39 CBG command structure; however, they do work closely with it in order to provide these services to the soldiers of the brigade group.

Medical
The medical needs of 39 CBG, such as tending to wounded troops in the field, are provided by two field ambulance units. These two units are part of the Royal Canadian Medical Service and 1 Health Services Group.
11 (Victoria) Field Ambulance in Victoria
12 (Vancouver) Field Ambulance in Vancouver

Military police
The military police support for 39 CBG is provided by the Canadian Forces Military Police. The military police unit assigned to the brigade is 12 Military Police Platoon (12 MP Pl) and is based out of the Colonel Sherman Armoury in Richmond. 12 Military Police Platoon reports to its parent units, 15 Military Police Company, and 1 Military Police Regiment, both based out of Canadian Forces Base Edmonton (CFB Edmonton).

Intelligence
Military intelligence services for 39 CBG are provided by 4 Platoon of 6 Intelligence Company based out the Major-General Bert Hoffmeister Building in Vancouver. The unit headquarters is at Brigadier James Curry Jefferson Armoury and operates several platoons in several brigade groups. 6 Int Coy operates platoons in:
Edmonton
Vancouver
Winnipeg

Exercise Cougar Salvo
Exercise Cougar Salvo is 39 CBG's annual field training exercise which combines the brigade as a whole. Every year, the exercise is held in a different location, usually in British Columbia. In 2006, it was held in the streets of Kamloops, in 2007, at HMCS Quadra Sea Cadet Summer Training Centre near Comox. However, it has been held in other locations, such as in the United States. In 2012, Exercise Cougar Salvo was held in Boise, Idaho.

References

External links

Brigades of the Canadian Army
Military units and formations established in 1997
Organizations based in Vancouver
1997 establishments in British Columbia